Simona Vinci (born 6 March 1970) is an Italian writer.

Life
Vinci was born in Milan and studied modern literature at the University of Bologna. Vinci was a member of the editorial board for the online literary magazine Incubatoio 16. In 2000, she hosted the cultural television program Cenerentola.

In 1997, Vinci published the novel Dei bambini non si sa niente; in 2000, it was awarded the  Elsa Morante award for best first work. It was translated into a number of different languages; its English title is A Game We Play. In Italy, the novel has been praised by some critics and condemned as perverted by others.

Selected works 
 In tutti i sensi come l'amore, short stories (1999), finalist for the Premio Campiello, translated into English as In Every Sense Like Love: Stories (2001)
 Corri Matilda, children's literature (1998)
 Matildacity, children's literature (1998)
 Come prima delle madri, novel (2003), finalist for the Premio Campiello
 Stanza 411, autobiographical fiction (2005)

References 

1970 births
Living people
Italian women novelists
Italian women short story writers
21st-century Italian novelists
University of Bologna alumni
Writers from Milan
21st-century Italian short story writers
21st-century Italian women writers